The tenth season of Acapulco Shore, a Mexican television programme based in Acapulco was announced on August, 2022 and premiered on September 27, 2022. Filming started in June 2022 in the coastal city of Puerto Vallarta, Jalisco, making this the second time the show is filmed in this city. Days after filming began rolling, a possible case of COVID-19 among cast members caused filming to be put on hold for a few days, before resuming. This season was announced in February 2022, via a Viacom press release. On August 28, 2022, the cast members were announced. This season marks the return of original cast member, Luis “Jawy” Méndez since his last appearance in Season 7. New cast members this season include Andrés Cervantes, Abel Robles, Elizabeth Varela, who previously participated in AYTO? and Resistiré, Ricardo “Ricky” Ochoa and Sebastián Gálvez, Alejandra Varela and Roberto Mora debuted later. The trailer of the season was released on September 12, 2022. Jaylin Castellanos and Rocío Sánchez were featured guests this season, while original castmember Fernando Lozada guest appeared in the final 2 episodes.

Ahead of the season premiere, during a press interview, original cast member Karime Pindter announced her engagement, plans for her upcoming wedding, and also revealed this was her final season on the show.

Cast 

 Abel Robles
 Alba Zepeda
 Alejandra Varela (Episodes 6–12)
 Andrés Cervantes (Episodes 1–11)
 Eduardo "Chile" Miranda
 Elizabeth “Eli” Varela
 Fernanda Moreno
 Isabel "Isa" Castro
 Jacky Ramírez
 Jaylin Castellanos (Episodes 8–9)
 Karime Pindter
 Luis "Jawy" Méndez
 Roberto "Robbie" Mora (Episodes 5–12)
 Rocío Sánchez  (Episodes 3–7)
 Ricardo "Ricky" Ochoa
 Sebastián Galvez

Duration of cast 

 = Cast member is featured in this episode.
 = Cast member arrives in the house.
 = Cast member voluntarily leaves the house.
 = Cast member leaves and returns to the house in the same episode.
 = Cast member returns to the house.
 = Cast member leaves the series.
 = Cast member returns to the series.
 = Cast member does not feature in this episode.
 = "Cast member" is not a cast member in this episode.

Episodes 
Note: Some episode titles have been adapted to a more understandable English translation

References 

Jersey Shore (TV series)
Mexican reality television series
2022 Mexican television seasons
Television productions suspended due to the COVID-19 pandemic